Pranam Walekum is a Hindi film which is the maiden directorial venture of  the award-winning actor Sanjay Mishra with Giselli Monteiro, Shilpa Shukla, Vindu Dara Singh, Tia Singh on the leads along with Irrfan Khan in a cameo. It is produced under Khushi Motion Pictures and expected to be released by the end of 2015. According to  Sanjai Mishra, the film is about a society which is losing innocence and simplicity.

Synopsis
Set in a remote society, the movie is all about  the chaos and confusion as a result of  a group of people's increased interest in subjects that don't belong to them. The movie focus on a society which lacks innocence and simplicity.

Cast
 Irrfan Khan in a cameo
 Giselli Monteiro
 Shilpa Shukla
 Vijay Raaz
 Tia Singh as a mentally challenged girl
 Manu Rishi
 Sanjay Mishra
 Manoj Pahwa
 Vindu Dara Singh

Production
Pranam Walekum  is produced by Bhushan Sharma and Sandiip Kapur. Hitting the floors in the early 2011, the movie is delayed due to many reasons. According to the crew, the movie can be placed in the off beat genre & intellectual cinema. Director stated that the movie is similar to the art film movement of 1970's but a different and refreshing take. The movie also marks the debut of the popular Delhi based model Tia Singh who is going to play a mentally challenged girl. The shooting happened mostly at Maharashtra, Delhi and Gurgaon. Irrfan Khan was roped into the film for doing a cameo. The movie also had to face objections from the Delhi Development Authority because of lacking proper permission for shooting.

References

External links
 

Unreleased Hindi-language films